Fabrizio Gollin (born 28 March 1975 in Camposampiero, Province of Padua) is an Italian racing driver who shared the FIA GT Championship with Luca Cappellari in 2004 while driving for BMS Scuderia Italia. He also is a winner of the Spa 24 Hours in 2004 & 2007. In 2008 he is racing for the Phoenix Carsport Team in a Chevrolet Corvette C6-R, and raced in the Daytona 24 Hours for Doran Racing in a Ford Daytona Prototype.

Racing record

Complete International Formula 3000 results
(key) (Races in bold indicate pole position; races in italics indicate fastest lap.)

Complete 24 Hours of Le Mans results

External links 
 Fabrizio Gollin's homepage
 FIA GT Championship  - Fabrizio Gollin

1975 births
Living people
People from Camposampiero
FIA GT Championship drivers
Italian racing drivers
International Formula 3000 drivers
British Formula 3000 Championship drivers
24 Hours of Le Mans drivers
24 Hours of Daytona drivers
European Le Mans Series drivers
24 Hours of Spa drivers
Sportspeople from the Province of Padua

Aston Martin Racing drivers
Larbre Compétition drivers
Durango drivers
Piquet GP drivers
Scuderia Coloni drivers
Phoenix Racing drivers
Nürburgring 24 Hours drivers